Matthew Watkins (born November 22, 1986) is a Canadian former professional ice hockey player who played a single game with the Phoenix Coyotes in the National Hockey League (NHL). He currently plays in the senior men's hockey in the WSHL with the Craik Warriors. He was selected by the Dallas Stars in the 5th round (160th overall) of the 2005 NHL Entry Draft. Watkins was born in Aylesbury, Saskatchewan, but grew up in Regina, Saskatchewan.

Playing career
Watkins signed a one-year contract with the Phoenix Coyotes on July 6, 2011. He was assigned for the majority of the 2011–12 season to AHL affiliate, the Portland Pirates.

Watkins left the Coyotes as a free agent to sign a one-year contract with the New York Islanders on July 1, 2012. He spent the duration of the 2012–13 season with the Islanders AHL affiliate, the Bridgeport Sound Tigers, posting 30 points in 68 games.

On July 8, 2013, he signed a one-year, two way contract as a free agent with the Washington Capitals. For the duration of his contract with the Capitals, Watkins was assigned to AHL affiliate, the Hershey Bears posting 27 points in 73 games of the 2013–14 season.

On July 27, 2014, Watkins signed his first European contract in agreeing to a one-year deal with Austrian club, the Vienna Capitals of the EBEL. As an alternate captain in the 2014–15 season with the Capitals, Watkins contributed offensively with 12 goals and 32 points in 54 games.

On June 18, 2015, Watkin left after one season with the Capitals, to sign a one-year contract with newly promoted Finnish club, KooKoo of the Liiga.

Career statistics

References

External links

1986 births
Living people
Bridgeport Sound Tigers players
Canadian expatriate ice hockey players in Austria
Canadian ice hockey right wingers
Dallas Stars draft picks
Hershey Bears players
Ice hockey people from Saskatchewan
KooKoo players
Las Vegas Wranglers players
North Dakota Fighting Hawks men's ice hockey players
Phoenix Coyotes players
Portland Pirates players
San Antonio Rampage players
Sportspeople from Regina, Saskatchewan
Vernon Vipers players
Vienna Capitals players